In differential geometry, the localization formula states: for an equivariantly closed equivariant differential form   on an orbifold M with a torus action and for a sufficient small  in the Lie algebra of the torus T,

The formula allows one to compute the equivariant cohomology ring of the orbifold M (a particular kind of differentiable stack) from the equivariant cohomology of its fixed point components, up to multiplicities and Euler forms. No analog of such results holds in the non-equivariant cohomology.

One important consequence of the formula is the Duistermaat–Heckman theorem, which states: supposing there is a Hamiltonian circle action (for simplicity) on a compact symplectic manifold M of dimension 2n,

Lie group action.)

The localization formula can also computes the Fourier transform of (Kostant's symplectic form on) coadjoint orbit, yielding the Harish-Chandra's integration formula, which in turns gives Kirillov's character formula.

The localization theorem for equivariant cohomology in non-rational coefficients is discussed in Daniel Quillen's papers.

Non-abelian localization 

The localization theorem states that the equivariant cohomology can be recovered, up to torsion elements, from the equivariant cohomology of the fixed point subset. This does not extend, in verbatim, to the non-abelian action. But there is still a version of the localization theorem for non-abelian actions.

References 

;   

Differential geometry